Kaya Özcan (born 1945) is a Turkish wrestler. He competed in the men's Greco-Roman 57 kg at the 1968 Summer Olympics.

References

External links
 

1945 births
Living people
Turkish male sport wrestlers
Olympic wrestlers of Turkey
Wrestlers at the 1968 Summer Olympics
People from Doğubayazıt